Wood Island may refer to:

Wood Island, an alternate name for Yerba Buena Island in the San Francisco Bay, California, United States
Wood Island (Marin County), in California
Wood Island Light, a lighthouse on Wood Island in Saco Bay, Maine, United States
Wood Island (MBTA station), a rapid transit station near Boston, Massachusetts, United States
Wood Islands, Prince Edward Island in Queens County, Prince Edward Island, Canada
Wood Island (New Brunswick), an island in the Bay of Fundy in New Brunswick, Canada
Wood Island (Livingston Island), an island in the South Shetland Islands, Antarctica
Wood Island, County Down in County Down, Northern Ireland